The Chulym is a river in Krasnoyarsk Krai, the Republic of Khakassia, and Tomsk Oblast in Russia, a right tributary of the Ob. The Chulym is formed at the confluence of the rivers Bely Iyus and Cherny Iyus in the Kuznetsk Alatau. The Chulym flows into the Ob near Molchanovo. The towns of Nazarovo, Achinsk, and Asino, and the village of Komsomolsk are located on the Chulym. The main tributaries are the Serezh, Uryup, Kiya and Yaya from the left and Bolshoy Uluy, Kemchug and Chichkayul from the right.

History
The Swedish explorer Johan Peter Falk noted 18th-century hunter gatherers living along the banks of the Chulym River.

References

Rivers of Krasnoyarsk Krai
Rivers of Tomsk Oblast